Rron Statovci (born 18 January 1997) is a Kosovo Albanian professional footballer who plays as a defender for Albanian club Partizani Tirana.

Club career

Llapi
On 6 June 2016, Statovci joined Football Superleague of Kosovo side Llapi, on a three-year contract.

Vllaznia Pozheran
On 22 July 2017, Statovci joined with the newly promoted team of Football Superleague of Kosovo side Vllaznia Pozheran, on a one-year contract.

Flamurtari
On 5 January 2018, Statovci joined Football Superleague of Kosovo side Flamurtari.

Partizani Tirana
On 6 July 2018, Statovci joined Albanian Superliga side Partizani Tirana, to replace the departed Arbnor Fejzullahu as the second choice and signed a three-year contract. On 12 September 2018, he made his debut with Partizani Tirana in an Albanian Cup match against Tërbuni Pukë after coming on as a substitute at 57th minute in place of Senad Hysenaj.

Return to Llapi
On 6 January 2019, Statovci returned to Football Superleague of Kosovo side Llapi.

International career
On 21 March 2017, Statovci received a call-up from Kosovo U21 for a 2019 UEFA European Under-21 Championship qualification match against Republic of Ireland U21 and made his debut after being named in the starting line-up.

References

External links

1997 births
Living people
Sportspeople from Pristina
Kosovo Albanians
Association football defenders
Kosovan footballers
Kosovo youth international footballers
Kosovo under-21 international footballers
KF Llapi players
KF Flamurtari players
FK Partizani Tirana players
Football Superleague of Kosovo players
Kategoria Superiore players
Kosovan expatriate footballers
Expatriate footballers in Albania
Kosovan expatriate sportspeople in Albania